Tiago Henrique Damil Gomes (born 29 July 1986) is a Portuguese professional footballer who plays as a left-back for F.C. Alverca.

Club career
Gomes was born in Oeiras, Lisbon District. A product of S.L. Benfica's youth ranks, he spent his first two professional seasons on loan, only appearing for his parent club during pre-season, 2006–07 at C.F. Estrela da Amadora – in the Primeira Liga – where he played with namesake Tiago Filipe Figueiras Gomes, and the following at Poland's Zagłębie Lubin.

In August 2008, Gomes signed for CA Osasuna on a free transfer, making no competitive appearances for the Navarrese in his only season. In the same period the following year he joined another Lisbon-based team, C.F. Os Belenenses, where he also did not manage to be first choice and they suffered relegation at the end of the campaign.

International career
On 7 November 2014, Gomes was called up by new Portugal manager Fernando Santos for a UEFA Euro 2016 qualifier against Armenia and a friendly with Argentina. He made his debut in the latter, starting but leaving injured after 51 minutes in an eventual 1–0 win at Old Trafford.

Career statistics

Club

References

External links

1986 births
Living people
People from Oeiras, Portugal
Sportspeople from Lisbon District
Portuguese footballers
Association football defenders
Primeira Liga players
Liga Portugal 2 players
Segunda Divisão players
S.L. Benfica B players
C.F. Estrela da Amadora players
C.F. Os Belenenses players
G.D. Estoril Praia players
S.C. Braga players
C.D. Feirense players
F.C. Alverca players
Ekstraklasa players
Zagłębie Lubin players
CA Osasuna players
Ligue 2 players
FC Metz players
Cypriot First Division players
Apollon Limassol FC players
Liga II players
FC Universitatea Cluj players
Portugal youth international footballers
Portugal under-21 international footballers
Portugal international footballers
Portuguese expatriate footballers
Expatriate footballers in Poland
Expatriate footballers in Spain
Expatriate footballers in France
Expatriate footballers in Cyprus
Expatriate footballers in Romania
Portuguese expatriate sportspeople in Poland
Portuguese expatriate sportspeople in Spain
Portuguese expatriate sportspeople in France
Portuguese expatriate sportspeople in Cyprus
Portuguese expatriate sportspeople in Romania